Xunlimen Station is an interchange station between Line 1 and Line 2 of the Wuhan Metro. It entered revenue service along with the completion of Line 1 (Phase 1) on July 28, 2004. The Line 2 platforms opened on December 28, 2012. It is located between Jianghan District and Jiangan District.

This station was sponsored by Wuhan Asia Heart disease Hospital, but the sponsorship has ended.

Station layout

Line 1
The Line 1 elevated station is located on Jinghan Boulevard.

Line 2
The Line 2 underground station is located on Jianghan Road.

Other

Line 2's exits are the old place of Xunlimen Railway Station.

Transfers
Bus transfers to Route 622, 553, 526, 533, 622, 532, 548, 601 and 592 are available at Xunlimen Station.

The bus stops near the station are 江汉路地铁循礼门站, 京汉大道地铁循礼门站.

References

External links

Wuhan Metro stations
Line 1, Wuhan Metro
Line 2, Wuhan Metro
Railway stations in China opened in 2004